Menzies Bay is a large bay adjoining Seymour Narrows and Quadra Island north of Campbell River on Vancouver Island.
It was once considered in 1872 as a crossing point to Vancouver Island for the Canadian Pacific Railway from
Sonora Island and Bute Inlet in that project's quest for a transcontinental line. The bay was the site of a Bloedel, Stewart and Welch railroad logging camp in the 1930s, and adjacent to Ripple Rock.

Background
There is a private campsite on the beach. The Akriggs say that this bay was likely named after Archibald Menzies, a botanist and surgeon who served aboard HMS Discovery and HMS Prince of Wales.

References

Bays of British Columbia
Mid Vancouver Island